Gary Charles Peters (April 21, 1937 – January 26, 2023) was an American professional baseball player. He was a Major League Baseball pitcher who played on two major league teams for 14 seasons, from 1959 through 1972. He was one of the best-hitting pitchers of his era.

Major league baseball
The Chicago White Sox signed Peters as an amateur free agent in  after he graduated from Grove City College. A left-handed pitcher, he led the American League in earned run average in 1963 and 1966, with the most wins in 1964. In 1965, he was limited by a bad back. Tommy John, who lived with him part of the year, recalled that Peters had to sleep on a mattress on the floor and could not stand up straight in the mornings. He led in fielding average as a pitcher in 1968. He stayed in the White Sox organization through the  season and was traded to the Boston Red Sox, where he spent the last three years of his playing career.

Peters was named to the American League All-Star roster in 1964 and 1967, and finished in the top 10 in the Most Valuable Player voting in 1963, 1964, and 1967. He had a .222 lifetime batting average and hit 19 home runs and 102 RBI. He was frequently used as a pinch-hitter, once winning a game with a pinch-hit home run. On May 5, 1968, Peters hit a grand slam in Comiskey Park, helping the White Sox to a 5-1 victory over the New York Yankees. He was also used as a pinch-runner.

Peters was a big practical joker. Once, when the White Sox went to play the Los Angeles Angels, they found themselves at the same hotel as the Yankees, who had not left for their next destination yet. Obtaining the key to Joe Pepitone's room, Peters snuck into the hitter's room in the middle of the night and started jumping on the bed and screaming, scaring the hitter tremendously until Pepitone finally got the lights turned on and figured out what had happened. Another time, he caught a baby octopus while skindiving and threw it at Ed Stroud in the locker room the next day.

On September 30, 2000, the Chicago White Sox announced that Gary Peters and 26 other former and active White Sox players were members of the Chicago White Sox All-Century Team.

Personal life and death
On January 26, 2023, it was announced that Peters had died at the age of 85.

Major League stats

MLB awards
 American League All-Star (1964, 1967)
 American League Rookie of the Year (1963)

MLB achievements
 American League leader in ERA (1963, 1966)
 American League leader in wins (1964)
 American League leader in fielding average as pitcher (1968)
 American League pennant team (1959)
 20-game winner (1964)
 Chicago White Sox All-Century Team (2000)

See also

 List of Major League Baseball annual ERA leaders
 List of Major League Baseball annual wins leaders
 List of Major League Baseball all-time leaders in home runs by pitchers

References

External links
, or SABR Biography Project

1937 births
2023 deaths
American League All-Stars
American League ERA champions
American League wins champions
American people of Dutch descent
Baseball players from Pennsylvania
Boston Red Sox players
Chicago White Sox players
Colorado Springs Sky Sox (WL) players
Davenport DavSox players
Dubuque Packers players
Florida Instructional League White Sox players
Grove City Wolverines baseball players
Holdrege White Sox players
Indianapolis Indians players
Major League Baseball pitchers
Major League Baseball Rookie of the Year Award winners
People from Grove City, Pennsylvania
Rapiños de Occidente players
San Diego Padres (minor league) players